The TR DL class, later known as the EAR 23 class, was a class of  gauge  steam locomotives derived from the Nigerian Railways Emir class.  The six members of the DL/23 class were built by Beyer, Peacock & Co. in Gorton, Manchester, England, for the Tanganyika Railway (TR).  They entered service on the TR in 1923, and were later operated by the TR's successor, the East African Railways (EAR).

Class list
The builder's and fleet numbers of each member of the class were as follows:

See also
History of rail transport in Tanzania
Rail transport in Kenya
Rail transport in Uganda

References

Notes

Bibliography

External links

Beyer, Peacock locomotives
East African Railways locomotives
Metre gauge steam locomotives
Railway locomotives introduced in 1923
Steam locomotives of Kenya
Steam locomotives of Tanzania
Steam locomotives of Uganda
DL class
4-8-0 locomotives